The 1968–69 Irish Cup was the 89th edition of the premier knock-out cup competition in Northern Irish football. 

Ards won the cup for the 3rd time, defeating Distillery 4–2 in the final replay at Windsor Park after the first game ended in a draw.

The holders Crusaders were eliminated in the quarter-finals by Ards.

Results

First round

|}

Replay

|}

Second replay

|}

Quarter-finals

|}

Semi-finals

|}

Replay

|}

Second replay

|}

Final

Replay

References

External links
The Rec.Sport.Soccer Statistics Foundation - Northern Ireland - Cup Finals

Irish Cup seasons
1968–69 in Northern Ireland association football
1968–69 domestic association football cups